Oreocossus kilimanjarensis is a moth in the family Cossidae. It is found in the Democratic Republic of Congo, Ethiopia, Kenya, Malawi, South Africa, Tanzania and Zimbabwe.

References

Natural History Museum Lepidoptera generic names catalog

Zeuzerinae